53rd Division or 53rd Infantry Division may refer to:

 53rd Division (1st Formation)(People's Republic of China), 1949–1957
 53rd Infantry Division (France)
 53rd Reserve Division (German Empire)
 53rd Infantry Division Arezzo, an Italian division of World War II
 53rd Division (Imperial Japanese Army)
 53rd (Welsh) Infantry Division, a British division of World Wars I and II
 53 Division (Sri Lanka)

See also
 53rd Regiment of Foot (disambiguation)